James Walter Thomas Jenkins (15 February 1897 – 25 April 1983) was an Australian rules footballer who played with St Kilda in the Victorian Football League (VFL). Jenkins also coached Coburg and Brunswick in the Victorian Football Association (VFA). He is a ruckman in the Coburg Football Club Team of the Century.

Early life in Tasmania
Born in Campbell Town, Tasmania on 15 February 1897, Jenkins was one of 12 children.

He played his early football with North Launceston in the Northern Tasmanian Football Association.

St Kilda
In 1921, at the age of 24, Jenkins moved to the mainland and joined St Kilda. Jenkins, who was a follower, played 16 games in each of his first three seasons.

Jenkins appeared in the opening round of the season in 1924, then left to coach Orbost.

He returned to St Kilda for the 1925 VFL season and again played the opening round of the season, which would be his 50th and final appearance for St Kilda.

Soon after, Jenkins was granted a permit to join Coburg in the Victorian Football Association.

VFA
Jenkins was the ruckman in Coburg's 1926, 1927 and 1928 premiership teams. A best and fairest winner in 1928, Jenkins was appointed captain-coach the following season. In his three seasons as coach, from 1929 to 1931, Coburg were unable to make the finals. He finished equal third in the 1930 Recorder Cup, but had his best finish in 1932, when he was equal second, one vote behind Northcote player Bob Ross. He left Coburg as the club's games record holder.

He captain-coached Brunswick in 1934 and 1935.

References

External links

1897 births
Australian rules footballers from Tasmania
St Kilda Football Club players
North Launceston Football Club players
Coburg Football Club players
Coburg Football Club coaches
Brunswick Football Club players
Brunswick Football Club coaches
1983 deaths